The Utah Tech Trailblazers, formerly known as the Dixie State Trailblazers, the Dixie State Red Storm and the Dixie State Rebels, are the 15 varsity athletic teams that represent Utah Tech University (formerly Dixie State University and similar names), located in St. George, Utah, in NCAA Division I intercollegiate sports. The Trailblazers compete as members of the Western Athletic Conference (WAC); in football, the school competes in the second level of D-I football, the Football Championship Subdivision (FCS).

Utah Tech began competing in NCAA Division II in the 2006–07 academic year (as Dixie State) after being a member of the National Junior College Athletic Association. From 1952 to 2009, as part of a general theme of Confederacy symbolism for the university, the school's nickname was the "Rebels", which was changed to the "Red Storm" in 2009. In 2016, the nickname was changed again to "Trailblazers".

On January 11, 2019, the university announced that it would move its sports program up to NCAA Division I by joining the WAC for all sports except football, which played as an FCS independent for one year before joining DSU's other sports in the WAC after it reinstated football for the 2021 season. The transition to D-I, which began upon the school's arrival in the WAC on July 1, 2020, will take four years; during this time, the Trailblazers will be ineligible for NCAA-sanctioned postseason play in any of their current sports.

On November 10, 2021, the Utah legislature approved the rebranding of the school from Dixie State University to Utah Tech University.  The publicly presented name change occurred in May 2022, with the change planned to take legal effect on July 1, 2022.

Sports sponsored

References

External links